Marsden Rock is a rock in Tyne and Wear, North East England, situated in Marsden, South Shields. It is overlooked by the Marsden Grotto. It was formerly known for its naturally-formed arch. The arch collapsed in 1996 following a winter of storms creating two separate stacks. The smaller of the two was demolished in 1997 due to safety concerns. The remaining stack is reachable on foot during low tide but is completely surrounded by water at high tide. The cliffs surrounding Marsden Rock are an important breeding ground for seabirds and colonies can often be seen on top of the rock itself, including kittiwakes, herring gulls, and razorbills.

Geology

Creation 

During the Carboniferous Period, the Marsden coast was part of a continent and tropical swampland which stretched across the equator. Over time, the peat, sand and mud hardened to form the coal measures and the land drifted north of the equator. This land became a desert and subsequently lay below sea level, flooded around 260 million years ago by the Zechstein Sea which periodically rose and fell. The Permian Magnesian rocks found on Marsden coast were formed around 250 million years ago. The land continued to drift northwards over the next 250 million years until it reached its current position. The ice age which occurred around 15,000 years ago was largely responsible for shaping the current landscape of the Marsden coastline and surrounding area.

Erosion 

The Magnesian Limestone coast along Tyne and Wear is variable; some sections are firm and compact whilst other sections are brittle and easily disintegrated by the sea and weather. Marsden Rock was formed by erosion of less-resistant stone along the joints of the cliffs of Marsden Bay, resulting in an isolated stack of compacted limestone. A channel was carved through the rock by waves which formed a natural arch. By the 1800s, the arch had become large enough for sailing boats to pass through at high tide. Small caves have been carved into the rock overtime which can be observed at low tide. Resistant beds, jutting out from the cliff and covered in vegetation, and promontories have also developed around the rock. The surrounding beach is composed of sand and gravel generated by shoreward drifting of sediment.

Marsden Rock has eroded and had various collapses throughout its history. In 1865, part of the rock gave way and five tons of rock fell through a building below. In early 1996 following a winter of storms, the top of the natural arch collapsed. This caused the rock to split into two separate stacks. It was demolished by the National Trust in 1997 in the interest of public safety.

In 2018, it was reported that the materials forming the cliffs near Marsden Rock were weak and highly prone to fragmentation, with continued evidence of weathering. In 2020, the Rock itself was reported as "broadly stable", but local collapses of cave formations were still possible.

Wildlife 

The limestone cliffs which surround Marsden Rock are among the most important breeding colonies for seabirds in the north east of England. In the summer, the cliffs by Marsden Rock are home to fulmars, cormorants, kittiwakes, herring gulls, and razorbills. The rock itself is an important habitat for cormorants, which have been there since 1960 but have never been seen to breed. Puffin and guillemot fly past the area regularly and terns feed offshore. In the late autumn, migrant terns, skuas, and gannets can be seen on the rock. Peregrine falcons can occasionally be found in the winter along with Lapland bunting and snow bunting. In 1998, it was reported that Marsden Rock was the site of the only recorded breeding ground for Manx shearwater on the east coast on mainland Britain.

Historical and cultural significance 

Marsden Rock has long been a local tourist attraction and significant landmark due to its appearance and history. It it believed to have once been a location for smuggling brandy and tobacco, the surrounding high cliff-faces providing cover for the moor boats. The rock is also famous for its eccentric inhabitants: Jack the Blaster was a smuggler, poacher and miner who inhabited Marsden Bay in the 18th century with his wife. It was reported that Jack moved to Marsden Bay in 1780 when he was almost 80 years old after refusing to pay rent at his house in Allenheads. A subsequent inhabitant, Peter Allan, was a local eccentric tavern-owner and builder who carved a home out of the rocks in Marsden Bay. In 1828, he moved in with his wife and family. By the late 19th century, the top of Marsden Rock was accessible by ladders and stairs which had been constructed by Peter Allan and his family. The excavations and access to picturesque views attracted the attention of holiday-makers. By 1887, it was reported that thousands of people had scaled the rock thanks to Allan's stairs. In 1903, a choir climbed onto the rock to perform a choral service. A contemporary news report recorded the event as "most inspiring to the listeners as they stood on the high cliffs of the mainland, and heard the great swell of choral praise floating over the wide waters and ascending to heaven."

The significance of Marsden Rock as a local landmark is evident in its various pictorial and artistic depictions. The rock has been featured on many postcards, photographs and paintings of the area. It is pictured on the Marsden Lodge Banner which represents the pitmen who worked in Whitburn Colliery alongside the phrase "Firm as a rock we stand". It has also appeared as a backdrop in the North-East drama Catherine Cookson.

There have been a number of songs and poems written about Marsden Rock. The Legend of Marsden Rock; or the life and adventures of Little Spottee, the hermit of the rock, is a four-part poem and ghost story written by John Young in 1800. A song about Marsden Rock, to the tune of Jockey to the Fair, was sung in the 19th century. John Lodge included a poem entitled Ode the Marsden Rock in his 1842 poetry collection – The Bard, and minor poems – dedicated to Prince Albert. The poem marvels in the physical qualities and surroundings of Marsden Rock.

References

Notes

Citations

External links

Blowing up the rock

Water towers in the United Kingdom
Sites of Special Scientific Interest in Tyne and Wear
Metropolitan Borough of South Tyneside
Landforms of Tyne and Wear
Stacks of England
United Kingdom
South Shields
Collapsed arches
Tidal islands of England